The Hepatitis C stem-loop IV is part of a putative RNA element found in the NS5B coding region. This element along with stem-loop VII, is important (but not essential) for colony formation, though its exact function and mechanism are unknown.

See also 
 Hepatitis C alternative reading frame stem-loop
 Hepatitis C virus (HCV) cis-acting replication element (CRE)
 Hepatitis C virus 3'X element
 Hepatitis E virus cis-reactive element

References

External links 
 

Cis-regulatory RNA elements
Hepatitis C virus